"The Ride" is the 74th episode of the HBO original series The Sopranos and the ninth of the show's sixth season. Written by Terence Winter and directed by Alan Taylor, it originally aired on May 7, 2006.

Starring
 James Gandolfini as Tony Soprano
 Lorraine Bracco as Dr. Jennifer Melfi 
 Edie Falco as Carmela Soprano
 Michael Imperioli as Christopher Moltisanti
 Dominic Chianese as Corrado Soprano, Jr. *
 Steven Van Zandt as Silvio Dante
 Tony Sirico as Paulie Gualtieri
 Robert Iler as Anthony Soprano, Jr.
 Jamie-Lynn Sigler as Meadow Soprano
 Aida Turturro as Janice Soprano Baccalieri 
 Steven R. Schirripa as Bobby Baccalieri
 Frank Vincent as Phil Leotardo
 John Ventimiglia as Artie Bucco
 Ray Abruzzo as Little Carmine Lupertazzi
 Dan Grimaldi as Patsy Parisi

* = credit only

Guest starring

Synopsis
Tony and Phil work out a deal to split the profits from the distribution of multivitamins acquired by Tony's crew. Phil suggests that Johnny be left out of the transaction, to which Tony agrees.

Chris is told by his girlfriend, Kelli, that she is pregnant. He is thrilled; they get married and buy a large house.

On their way home from a trip to Pennsylvania, Chris and Tony stop outside a town because Tony needs to urinate. They see two bikers stealing vintage wine from a liquor store. As the bikers go back into the store, Chris and Tony plunder their wine. They speed away and Chris exchanges gunfire with one of the bikers, wounding him. Exhilarated, Tony and Chris celebrate at a restaurant. Chris decides to break his abstinence when Tony toasts his wedding. Later, as they drink more wine in the parking lot, they reminisce about good and bad times, including the day when Chris told Tony about Adriana and the Feds. They say they love each other.

Chris pays Corky for the hit on Rusty, partly in heroin. He ends up using heroin with Corky, spending a night of the Feast of Elzéar of Sabran in a stupor.

During the Feast, Tony and his crew manage a five-day street festival for the benefit, Paulie says, of a non-profit foundation. However, a new priest has looked into the finances and tells Paulie and Patsy that their donation to the church should be raised from $10,000 to $50,000. When Paulie refuses to pay, he tells them they will not be permitted to display the traditional golden hat which adorns the statue of the saint. Several parishioners notice that the hat is missing, and word begins to spread that Paulie scrimped on the festival.

Paulie's penny-pinching is blamed for an accident on a teacup ride at the festival, which leaves several people injured, including a child. Little Paulie is left to deal with the police investigation. Janice and her daughter Domenica are on the ride and unhurt, but Janice pretends to develop a neck injury after hearing Meadow's suggestion that the injured should be compensated monetarily. Janice presses Bobby to get the money. Threatening the ride operator, Bobby learns that Paulie refused to pay for a repair crew, or for newer and safer rides. In a public confrontation at the feast, Paulie refuses to compensate Bobby. Tension lingers; Tony instructs Paulie to work things out with him.

Paulie encounters Nucci, who tells him that his low spending was not only wrong but sinful; Paulie swears at her and departs, leaving his adoptive mother in tears. At home, he is sleepless. Another source of stress is his fear that he has prostate cancer. Very early the next morning, at the Bada Bing, Paulie sees a vision of the Virgin Mary. Shaken, he visits Nucci at Green Grove that night and sits quietly next to her while they watch The Lawrence Welk Show together.

First appearance
 Kelli Lombardo Moltisanti: Christopher's new girlfriend and later wife.

Title reference
 The episode's title most directly refers to an amusement ride at the feast which breaks down on which Janice, Bobby III, and Domenica were all riding.
 Tony spins Domenica around as in a ride.
 The title may also refer to the ride to Pennsylvania Tony and Christopher were taking when they stole the wine and bonded.
 It may refer to the philosophical "thrill ride" discussed by Tony and Dr. Melfi—something people are ready to pay their money for and actively seek to temporarily escape their mundane lives.

Production
 The episode includes a flashback scene of Christopher's emotional revelation to Tony that Adriana had been working for the FBI. That scene was originally shot as part of episode 5.12, "Long Term Parking" (directed by Tim Van Patten and photographed by Alik Sakharov), but had been cut to heighten the suspense surrounding Adriana's murder.
 The feast depicted in the episode and named as the Feast of St. Elzéar is based on the annual Feast of St. Gerard, organized every October around the church of St. Lucy's in the Seventh Avenue of Newark, a historical neighborhood of Italian-Americans, which used to be known as the First Ward. In addition to the street procession with the dollar-bill-covered statue of the saint, the feast features light shows, street decorations with colors of the Italian flag, food stands, and music (including an orchestra). David Chase said that he wanted to create an episode about the feast ever since the first season.
 Actor Tony Sirico, who plays Paulie, cited the final scene as probably his character's favorite thing to do with his mother as a child, going on to explain that he really has no one else who loves him, which explains Nucci's sudden change in mood and silence.

References to prior episodes
 Paulie is not able to sleep and anxiously calls his doctor to learn the results of the prostate biopsy at 3 AM. In "From Where to Eternity," Christopher, awoken from a coma, told Paulie a message from what he claimed to have been the afterlife he visited—"three o'clock." Paulie disavowed the Church in that episode. This time, Paulie curses at the statue of Saint Elzéar, refuses to pay for its hat to be carried on it during the procession, and insults his adoptive mother by mentioning sinful deeds until he has a disturbing vision of the Virgin Mary at the Bada Bing!.

Other cultural references
 Christopher is watching the movie Saw II at the start of the episode.
 During the first scene of The Feast of San Elzear, the music playing is from the opera Cavalleria rusticana.
 Upon arriving at a house that he is looking at for a potential purchase, Christopher says, "This is what I'm talking about, stately Wayne Manor" (the residence of Bruce Wayne).
 Following Tony and Christopher's heist of the wine (and again when Tony unloads the wine in his basement), Christopher comments that one of the bikers, with scraggly hair and a full mustache and beard, looked like "Grizzly Adams," a famed 19th Century mountaineer, later made popular as the title character in the 1977–1978 NBC television series The Life and Times of Grizzly Adams.
 The wine Chris and Tony steal is 1986 Château Pichon Longueville Comtesse de Lalande, an expensive Bordeaux claret. Chris sells his five cases for $300; a pittance at $5 a bottle.
 The episode uses a reference to Hurricane Katrina. Tony runs into Paulie in the bathroom and says "you're doing a heck of a job there, Brownie," a reference to a similar statement made by George W. Bush to then-Federal Emergency Management Agency director Michael Brown. Bush's comment is often used to sarcastically praise someone who is doing a poor job. 
 Christopher calls Tony "The Bad Lieutenant." The film of that name is a 1992 Abel Ferrara tale full of religious undertones and Catholic iconography similar to this episode. In the film, the unnamed Lieutenant sees a vision of Christ just as Paulie sees a vision of the Virgin Mary at the Bada Bing!.
 When Tony denies Christopher killed Adriana, he mentions O. J. Simpson and Scott Peterson to Carmela as examples of a lethal domestic violence case.

Music
 The song playing in the background at the Bada Bing! while Christopher announces his marriage is "Flash and Crash" by 1960s Seattle garage rock band Rocky & The Riddlers.
 The music playing while Christopher and Tony are driving and stealing wine is "All Right Now" by British rock band Free.
 The song briefly heard while Christopher and Tony are driving home is "Midnight Rider" by Buddy Miles.
 The song playing throughout Christopher's high is "The Dolphins" by folk artist Fred Neil.
 The song played when Tony Soprano and Phil Leotardo meet at the feast is "A Chi" by Italian singer Fausto Leali. The song is played again at the end of the episode when Tony and Carmela join the Baccalieris at the feast.
 The song played when Tony Soprano lifts his niece and spins her around is "Red River Rock" by Johnny & The Hurricanes.
 The polka played on accordion by Myron Floren on The Lawrence Welk Show during Paulie's visit to Nucci is the Norwegian children's song "Hompetitten" (presented as "Johnny Oslo Schottische"). The music was written by Gunnar Wahlberg and originally had lyrics by Alf Prøysen.
 A live cover version of "Pipeline", performed by Johnny Thunders, plays over the episode credits.

References

External links
"The Ride"  at HBO

2006 American television episodes
The Sopranos (season 6) episodes
Television episodes written by Terence Winter